Foregut fermentation is a form of digestion that occurs in the foregut of some animals. It has evolved independently in several groups of mammals, and also in the hoatzin bird.

Foregut fermentation is employed by ruminants and pseudoruminants, some rodents and some marsupials. It has also evolved in colobine monkeys and in sloths.

See also
 Ruminant foregut fermentation
 Hindgut fermentation

References

Digestive system